Mark C. Fayne (born May 15, 1987) is an American former professional ice hockey player. He played with the New Jersey Devils and Edmonton Oilers of the National Hockey League (NHL). He was selected by the Devils in the 5th round (155th overall) of the 2005 NHL Entry Draft.

Playing career

Early career

Fayne was born in Nashua, New Hampshire and raised in Bourne, Massachusetts. He attended Providence College where he played four seasons (2006–10) of Hockey East college hockey. Before Providence College, he played hockey for the prestigious Noble and Greenough School under the coaching of Brian Day.

New Jersey Devils
Turning professional for the 2010–11 season, Fayne had played only 16 games for the Devils' AHL affiliate Albany Devils before receiving an emergency call-up to the NHL on November 22, 2010. He scored his first NHL goal in his 10th game on December 15, 2010 against Ilya Bryzgalov of the Phoenix Coyotes.

On July 20, 2012, Fayne signed a two-year deal worth $2.6 million in order to remain with the Devils. Fayne played in 31 out of the lockout shortened 48 games during the 2012-13 New Jersey Devils season, largely due to injuries (including wrist surgery to repair a torn ligament just prior to the season, and a season ending "bulging disc" in his lower back). He played in 71 games during the 2013-14 New Jersey Devils season.

Edmonton Oilers
On July 1, 2014, Fayne signed a four-year $14 million contract with the Edmonton Oilers after becoming an unrestricted free agent.

Entering the final year of his contract with the Oilers, and having failed to play up to expectations, Fayne began the season in the AHL, continuing his tenure with affiliate, the Bakersfield Condors. He appeared in just 6 games with the Condors in the 2017–18 campaign before he was loaned to fellow AHL club, the Springfield Thunderbirds on December 19, 2017. In order for the Thunderbirds to accept Fayne, their NHL affiliate the Florida Panthers also acquired Greg Chase from the Oilers.

On September 4, 2018, Fayne was invited to attend the Boston Bruins' training camp on a professional tryout agreement.

Career statistics

Regular season and playoffs

International

Awards and honors

References

External links

1987 births
Living people
Albany Devils players
American men's ice hockey defensemen
Bakersfield Condors players
Edmonton Oilers players
Ice hockey players from Massachusetts
Ice hockey people from New Hampshire
New Jersey Devils draft picks
New Jersey Devils players
Noble and Greenough School alumni
People from Bourne, Massachusetts
Providence Friars men's ice hockey players
Sportspeople from Barnstable County, Massachusetts
Sportspeople from Nashua, New Hampshire
Springfield Thunderbirds players